Halocaridina is a genus of atyid shrimp. It contains two species – Halocaridina rubra and Halocaridina palahemo – both endemic to Hawaii. H. rubra is widely kept in aquaria.

References

Atyidae
Crustaceans of Hawaii
Endemic fauna of Hawaii